Christiane Yao is a retired Côte d'Ivoire hurdler.

She won a silver medal in the 4 × 100 metres relay at the 2002 African Championships, and also finished seventh in the 100 metres hurdles as well as fifth (and last) in the 400 metres hurdles at the same event.

References

Year of birth missing (living people)
Living people
Ivorian female hurdlers
Place of birth missing (living people)